Bonilla is an unincorporated community in Beadle County, in the U.S. state of South Dakota.

History
Bonilla was laid out in 1884. A post office called Bonilla was established in 1883, and remained in operation until 1973.

References

Unincorporated communities in Beadle County, South Dakota
Unincorporated communities in South Dakota